D-Day is a 2013 Indian Hindi-language action thriller film co-produced by DAR Motion Pictures and Emmay Entertainment. The movie is directed by Nikhil Advani and stars Rishi Kapoor, Irrfan Khan, Arjun Rampal, Huma Qureshi and Shruti Haasan in prominent roles. The film was released on 19 July 2013 to generally positive reception.

Plot
Agent Wali Khan, appointed by the Chief of Indian intelligence agency Research and Analysis Wing (RAW), Ashwini Rao, has been on a mission for nine years to keep an eye out for the activities of India's most wanted D-Company leader, Goldman  while working as a local barber as a cover. One day he notices Goldman talking about his son's wedding cards to people in the mosque where he prays and learns that his son is getting married and Goldman is breaking his security protocol to attend that. The same is confirmed by an ISI operative who works part-time as Goldman's bodyguard and is a neighbor and friend of Wali though he doesn't know the truth about Wali's connections to Indian Intelligence. Sensing a chance to nab Goldman alive, he informs Ashwini about the same who assembles a team quickly - Ex-Indian Army officer and mercenary, Rudra Pratap Singh, RAW's explosives expert, Zoya Rehman, and Aslam, a Mumbai thief and a murderer who was given a chance at freedom by participating in this mission.

On the day of the wedding, Wali sees his wife and son off at the airport, as they are to fly to London. Wali goes home and stages his family's death in the hopes that the ISI will not put them in harm's way and he can join them after the mission is accomplished. However, all flights to Europe are cancelled, stranding Wali's wife and son at the airport. When Wali's wife calls up Wali, his phone is switched off, and she learns her house is on fire. Disturbed and upset about not being able to locate Wali, she informs the airport security about the same. The airport security personnel runs a check to see and discovers that three bodies have been recovered. Suspicious at the coverup, he summons the ISI. The ISI, while questioning Nafisa and her son Kabir, notices Kabir holding pencils that belong to the same hotel where Goldman's son is about to get married. When asked, Kabir informs that the pencils were given to him by Wali a few days ago. Realizing that Wali is an operative out to get Goldman, ISI alerts their counterparts at the wedding. As a result, Wali, Rudra, Zoya, and Aslam's plan to capture Goldman is in jeopardy. Goldman escapes unscathed, and the four agents have to go into hiding. Embarrassed at the failure of their operation, the Indian government disavows the four agents; only Ashwini stands by them, but he is forced to resign. Aslam is captured and tortured by Goldman's nephew when he tries to escape through the Karachi docks. He is rescued by Rudra, who was trying to take revenge on Goldman's nephew for murdering Rudra's lover, Suraiya, a Pakistani prostitute. Upon hearing that Wali's wife has died and that his son is in ISI custody, the four agents decide to find a way to complete their mission, despite the government having abandoned them.

The ISI decides that Goldman is too much of a liability to continue protecting further, so they decide to kill him. Before they can, the four RAW agents take out the ISI and take Goldman hostage. Wali notifies Ashwini, who works to find them a safe route out of Pakistan. Goldman taunts Wali by telling him that his wife and son are actually still alive, and that he can arrange their reunion. Wali is torn between accepting Goldman's help and completing his mission, to the point where he shoots Rudra to take control of the group. Ashwini asks them to be at Checkpost 35 before 6 AM. At the same time, Wali arranges a meeting with ISI, proposing an exchange of Goldman for his wife and child. After tying Rudra up and disarming Zoya, Wali leaves with Goldman. Zoya then frees Rudra, and they follow Wali.

Wali drives to Checkpost 40 but is shot dead by Pakistani forces, who, unbeknownst to Wali, have poisoned and killed his wife and son. As Wali's car is examined, it is revealed that Wali did not actually bring Goldman with him; he had apparently anticipated the Pakistani betrayal, and had left Goldman in the car that Zoya and Rudra had taken. Through flashbacks, it is revealed that this was a plan hatched by Wali and Rudra in order to get Goldman to cooperate and give Rudra and Zoya time to get Goldman across the border to India. The Pakistani forces give Rudra and Zoya a chase and barely miss them before they bring Goldman over the border, where Ashwini is waiting. Once across, Goldman taunts them by saying how nothing has changed in India and he will be released soon and will be able to continue his criminal activities. Rudra shoots Goldman in the left arm and right leg, pulls off his glares and shoots in the head, indicating that he is the face of the "New India".

Cast
 Irrfan Khan as RAW Agent Wali Khan  
 Arjun Rampal as Rudra Pratap Singh, a suspended army officer, working as a mercenary
 Rishi Kapoor as Iqbal Seth Aka Goldman (a character based upon Dawood Ibrahim)
 Huma Qureshi as Zoya Rehman, Explosive Expert
 Shruti Haasan as Suraiya, a Pakistani prostitute
 Nassar as Chief of RAW Ashwini Rao
 Shriswara as Nafisa Khan, Wali Khan's wife
 Sandeep Kulkarni as Anup Mishra
 KK Raina as Gen. Raza
 Chandan Roy Sanyal as Goldman's nephew
 Aakash Dahiya as Aslam
 Dwij Handa as Kabir Khan, Wali Khan's son
 Imran Hasnee as Saleem Pathan
 Nissar Khan as Niyaaz Ahmed
 Chetan Motiwala in a special appearance as a guest in the wedding
 Anil Maggu as Pakistani politician
 Kanika Dang as Fatima
 Karan as Goldman's son
 Rashmi as Goldman's son's bride
 Rajpal Yadav as a Sufi singer in a friendly appearance
 Jehangir Karkaria as father-in-law
 Manish Khanna as Sharyar Bhatti
 Ashwini Dhar as Khurram Mirza
 Praveena Deshpande as Sumitra, Ashwini Rao's wife
 Niranjan Iyengar as Mosque care-taker
Savi Sidhu as K.S. Lodhi
 Libert as Laxman Sivaraman
 Sanjay as MEA Minister
 J.Tanna as Vicky Thakur
 Pathan as Goldman's bodyguard
 Raees as Azhar
 Satyabrat Chakravarty as Dipankar Ghosh
 Mukesh Singh as Lodge care-taker
 Amin Arif as Broker
 Arya Chaurasia as ISI Official
 Ram Chandra Thakur as Airport Official
 Manoj Sharma as BSF Director
 Garvita Sharma as News reporter
 Baba Khan as trawler captain
 Sunil Singh as ISI head
 Maryam Zakaria as Item number "Ek Ghadi"
Asif Silavat Cop at airport
Gurnam Singh Dhaliwal Bodyguard at the mosque
Rajkumar Rao Moin

Production

Casting
Nikhil Advani signed Shruti Hassan opposite actor Arjun Rampal in December 2012.

Out of the three female protagonists in the movie, only Huma Qureshi was given the option of choosing the character she wanted to portray. The same choice was put forward to and exercised by Deepika Padukone in the 2012 flick Cocktail.

Marketing
The first trailer of D-Day was released on 22 May 2013. The film was promoted by the star cast in Delhi, Jaipur, Indore, Mumbai etc. Huma Qureshi and Arjun Rampal promoted the film on Dance India Dance DID Super Moms. Irrfan Khan and Arjun Rampal promoted the film in the show Comedy Nights with Kapil. Rishi Kapoor and Arjun Rampal promoted the film in the dance show Jhalak Dikhhla Jaa.

Soundtrack

The soundtrack album was released on 28 June 2013 with music directed by the music trio Shankar–Ehsaan–Loy. The lyricist is Niranjan Iyengar.

Reception
The album of D-Day received mixed to positive reviews. Vipin of Music Aloud gave the album a score of 8 out of 10 and called the album "another outstanding soundtrack", further praising the music directors, "Shankar Ehsaan Loy’s brilliant form continues in D-Day!". Giving the album 3.5/5 stars, Rafat of Glamsham commented, "one complements S-E-L for another classy effort after BHAAG MILKHA BHAAG." He went on to write, "They have delivered as per the expectations and songs like, 'Duma Dum', 'Mera Murshid Khele Holi' and 'Ek Ghadi Aur' are our picks, and one just hopes for the sake of lovers of classy music that D-DAY too is lapped up and the film garners critical and commercial acclaims when it releases on 19th July." Sankhayan Ghosh of Indian Express gave the album a score of 3 out of 5 and concluded his review, "D-Day is an uncharacteristically authentic album according to Bollywood standards that throws up interesting results." Writing for Bollywood Hungama, Rajiv Vijayakar gave the album a mixed review, stating, "The score is a mixed bag and could have been more uniform. The lyrics are a major issue in the album (except in Ek Ghadi Aur), and so the tried-and-tested Duma Dum, though not original, emerges as the mainstay of the score."

Release
D-Day was given a U/A certificate by the censor board on 
8 July 2013. The movie released on 19 July 2013, in 1200 screens worldwide.

Reception

Critical reception
D-Day received generally positive reviews from the critics. Taran Adarsh of Bollywood Hungama gave the movie 4 stars out of 5, concluding that "D-DAY is what a well-made thriller ought to be -- taut, transfixing and spellbinding, with an astounding finale. Don't miss this high-octane thriller!" D-Day has all the right ingredients that make it a memorable film, writes Paloma Sharma of Rediff.com. The Hindu stated that D-Day sends out a strong statement. The problem is that it is emotional. And modern India is not that naive. Rajeev Masand of CNN-IBN gave it 3 out of 5 stars and stated that D-Day is far from perfect, but as pulpy Bollywood action films go, it's very watchable and works its strengths. The film's ending, controversial and melodramatic, to say the least, nevertheless sits comfortably with the wish-fulfilment fantasy that Advani's milking. Sneha May Francis of Emirates 24/7described the film as a "sensational take on India’s most notorious gangster".  Subhash K. Jha of IANS called the film "an acutely accomplished work of art". Deccan Chronicle praised the film and stated that Rishi Kapoor makes the best Dawood Ibrahim. He has the demeanour, and an ominous aura. NDTV gave it 3 stars.

Box office
India
D-Day had occupancies of around 15–20% in the morning shows. The movie collected  net in its first day, which was later changed to as  net. The movie saw a sharp rise in the collections in the second day, with an estimated amount of  net, which was later estimated at  net. The movie went on to collect  net on Sunday, taking its first weekend collections to  net. The movie went on to collect  net in its first week. It collected  net in its second week, taking its total collections to  net. It was declared Flop by Box Office India, which estimated its two-week collections at  net.

Overseas
D-Day was dull in the overseas, collecting $425,000 in its first weekend. The movie could not do strong business in the overseas front, collecting  in two weeks and was declared an average.

Awards and nominations

Dubbing version
The film was dubbed into Telugu  as Gelupu Gurram in 2014 because of Shruti Haasan's popularity in Andhra Pradesh and Telangana.

References

External links
 
 

2013 films
2010s Hindi-language films
2013 action thriller films
Indian action thriller films
Films set in Mumbai
Films set in Karachi
India–Pakistan relations in popular culture
Indian detective films
Films about organised crime in India
Films scored by Shankar–Ehsaan–Loy
Films about the Research and Analysis Wing
Indian gangster films
Films with screenplays by Ritesh Shah
Indian Army in films
Military of Pakistan in films
Films directed by Nikkhil Advani
D-Company